Disability Pride Month occurs in the United States every July to commemorate the passing of the landmark Americans with Disabilities Act (ADA) in July 1990. The celebration has been officially recognized by New York City mayor Bill de Blasio and San Francisco mayor London Breed. Disability Pride is also celebrated worldwide, including in the United Kingdom, South Africa, and other countries during various times of the year. Disability Pride Parades are parades held annually to celebrate the month in Chicago, Los Angeles, New York, San Francisco, San Antonio, Philadelphia, and Pittsburgh among others.

Since 1990, Disability Pride Month has celebrated all 1 billion disabled people , their identities and culture, and their contributions to society. It also seeks to change the way people think about and define disability, to end the stigma of disability, and to promote the belief that disability is a natural part of human diversity in which people living with disabilities can celebrate and take pride. People with disabilities make up 15% of the world's population and are the largest and most diverse minority in the United States making up approximately 26% of the population representing all ages, races, ethnicities, genders, sexual orientations, religions, and socio-economic backgrounds.

History 
On March 12, 1990, over 1,000 people marched from the White House to the U.S. Capitol to demand that Congress pass the Americans with Disabilities Act. Upon arrival, about 60 activists, including eight-year-old Jennifer Keelan-Chaffins, physically demonstrated the inaccessibility of public spaces by getting out of their wheelchairs or setting aside their mobility aids and crawling up the Capitol steps in an act of civil disobedience that later became known as the Capitol Crawl. 104 activists were arrested for unlawful demonstration, many of whom were in their wheelchairs.

On July 26, 1990 President George H.W. Bush signed the Americans with Disabilities Act into law. Each July is celebrated as Disability Pride Month in commemoration of the historic moment.

Disability Pride 
The concept of Disability Pride was born out of the Disability Rights movement and based on intersectional identity politics and social justice. The core concept of Disability Pride is based on a tenet of reworking the negative narratives and biases that frequently surround the concept of disability. Disability Pride is a response and counteraction against ableism and social stigma. The concept has roots in the same social theory that backs LGBT Pride and Black Pride. Disability Pride is a movement intended to celebrate the history of the Disability Rights movement and people with disabilities as positive contributors to society. It marks a break from traditional concepts of disabilities as shameful conditions, which were often hidden from public spaces and mainstream awareness. Disability Pride is built upon the social model of disability and is described as moving away from the medical model of disability.

Celebrations and Locations

Boston, Massachusetts, USA 
The first Disability Pride Day was held October 6, 1990 in Boston, Massachusetts. According to a newspaper clipping from the day, "more than 400 people marched, drove, wheeled and moved from City Hall to Boston Common in a demonstration to affirm that 'far from tragic, disability is a natural part of the human experience.'" The featured speaker was Karen Thompson, author of Why Can't Sharon Kowalski Come Home? It was held again in 1991 but ended after that due to the death of lead organizer, Diana Viets, and with the move of co-organizer Catherine Odette to Madison, Wisconsin.

Chicago, Illinois, USA 

The first Chicago Disability Pride Parade was the first such parade in the United States after the Boston-based parades of the 1990s. It was held July 18, 2004 in Chicago with Yoshiko Dart as the Parade Grand Marshal.  The first Chicago parade was funded with $10,000 in seed money that Sarah Triano received in 2003 as part of the Paul G. Hearne Leadership award from the American Association of People with Disabilities. According to Triano, fifteen hundred people attended the parade. Disability Pride Parades have been held in Chicago each subsequent July with a theme and a grand marshal each year with the exception of 2020 and 2021 due to the COVID-19 pandemic.

The Chicago Disability Pride Parade describes the goals of its celebration in its mission statement:

 To change the way people think about and define "disability",
 To break down and end the internalized shame among people with Disabilities; and
 To promote the belief in society that Disability is a natural and beautiful part of human diversity in which people living with Disabilities can take pride.

New York City, New York, USA 
On July 26, 1992, New York City held its first Disability Independence Day March. Congress Member Major Owens was a keynote speaker. The last Disability Independence Day March was held on July 28, 1996. New York City began holding Disability Pride Parades annually in 2015 when mayor Bill de Blasio declared July Disability Pride Month. Jazz musician Mike LeDonne's daughter Mary Patterson LeDonne was born in 2004 with multiple disabilities and that was the spark that lit the fire for the Annual Disability Pride NYC Parade. He first started putting together ideas for a Disability Pride Parade in New York City in 2011. He formed a nonprofit called Disability Pride NYC, Inc. (DPNYC) in 2014. That same year, the Mayor's Office for People With Disabilities (MOPD) was planning a 25th anniversary of the signing of the Americans with Disabilities Act celebration and decided to join forces with DPNYC to realize the first annual Disability Pride Parade on July 12, 2015. Some seed money for the parade was raised from a Jazz concert called Jazz Legends Play For Disability Pride put on by LeDonne in which many Jazz musicians donated their talent for the night. Almost 4,000 people showed up for the first parade, which culminated with a celebration featuring the talents of the disability community. Tom Harkin and Mary LeDonne (daughter of Mike LeDonne, Founder/President of Disability Pride NYC ) were its grand marshals.

Brighton, England 
Disability Pride Brighton is an annual event used to promote visibility and mainstream awareness of the positive pride felt by people with disabilities within their community in Brighton, England. Disability Pride Brighton was started in 2016 by Jenny Skelton after her daughter, Charlie, suffered an incident of disability discrimination in Brighton. Jenny posted on Facebook about the incident along with the final line of text "Disability Pride anyone?" The Facebook post went viral and was then picked up by the media. After receiving hundreds of messages from other disabled people who had experienced similar incidents, she decided to proceed with the idea. A year later in 2017 the first Disability Pride Brighton festival was held on New Road in Brighton with an attendance of approximately 2000 people. Held every year since 2017, Disability Pride Brighton is a free event. There are stalls from various charities and disability groups, as well as live performances and art by disabled artists. Due to the limitations of COVID-19 lockdowns, the event moved online in 2020 with a two and a half hour show hosted by Latest TV which also aired on Freeview on July 12, 2020.

Wellington, Aotearoa/New Zealand 
Celebrations in New Zealand were started by Nick Ruane and Rachel Noble in 2016 as a pilot Disability Pride Week to celebrate disability pride. The event included art, storytelling, and a defined kaupapa, or set of values. It spread nationwide and is intentionally inclusive of the indigenous Māori people and their culture. The event has been held in September, November, and December.

The New Zealand Disability Pride Week statement says events should explore or demonstrate Disability Pride, have disabled people leading the planning and implementation of the event, acknowledge members of the disability community who have gone, and be fun and inclusive.

Locations 
Disability Pride Parades have been held many times in many places across the United States and often hold traditions unique to the location, like a disability justice flag raise at city hall and a full week of free events in Philadelphia. Other Disability Pride Celebrations have occurred in England, Germany, New Zealand, Norway, and South Korea. As of 2022, Disability Pride Month is not yet nationally recognized in the United States.

Disability Pride Week 
Disability Pride Parades also usually coincide with Disability Pride Week in the communities where they are held. Disability Pride Week is an annual event used to promote visibility and mainstream awareness of the positive pride felt by people with disabilities within their community. The ensuing events combine the celebration of disability culture with educational events, such as seminars on legal rights for people with disabilities, accessibility awareness, and similar topics.

Disability Pride Flag 

Disability Pride has a flag created by Ann Magill and entered into the public domain in 2019. Magill's original flag featured a lightning bolt design and bright colors on a black background. The flag was redesigned in 2021 with muted colors and straight stripes in response to feedback from those with visually triggered disabilities. The new design limits the strobe effect created by the lightning bolt to be more visually safe for those with migraines and visually triggered seizures. The color brightness changes make the flag more accessible to those with color blindness. The new flag comprises a number of different elements, each symbolizing different aspects of the disability experience.
All six "standard" flag colors: Disability spans borders between states and nations
Black Field: Mourning for victims of ableist violence and abuse
Diagonal Band: "Cutting across" the walls and barriers that separate the disabled from society
Red Stripe: Physical disabilities
Gold Stripe: Neurodivergence
White Stripe: Invisible and undiagnosed disabilities
Blue Stripe: Psychiatric disabilities
Green Stripe: Sensory disabilities

See also
 Disability rights movement
 Disability History Month
 Disability justice
 Disability studies
 Disability flag
 Ableism
 National Disability Employment Awareness Month
 Mad Pride

References

July observances
Disability rights